James "Mad Bomber" Belcastro (1895 – August 23, 1945) was a Black Hand gang member, extortionist, and later chief bomber for the Chicago Outfit during Prohibition.

Biography
Known as "King of the Bombers", Belcastro was highly skilled at constructing improvised explosive devices. He used these skills to extort money from business owners in Chicago's Little Italy district during the 1910s. In the early 1920s, Johnny Torrio and Al Capone formed the Chicago Outfit and put the Black Hand gangs out of business.  However, Capone invited Belcastro to join the Outfit and he soon became a prominent member. During the mid to late 1920s, Belcastro was suspected of causing over 100 deaths while bombing saloons that refused to buy alcohol from Capone.

During the 1927 Chicago primary elections – the so-called "Pineapple Primary" – Belcastro launched a bombing campaign against the opponents of Capone ally and Mayor, William Hale Thompson.  He primarily attacked voting stations inwards where opinion was thought to oppose Thompson. killing at least 15 people.  Lawyer Octavius Granada, an African American who dared challenged Thompson's candidate for the African American vote was chased through the streets on polling day by cars of gunmen before being shot dead. Belcastro was arrested in October 1927 and charged with Granady's murder, his co-charged included four policemen; all charges were dropped after key witnesses recanted their statements. By the end of the 1920s, the Chicago Crime Commission had listed Belcastro on its famous "public enemies" list.

Later years
On January 11, 1931, Belcastro was shot five times in the head and body. An indication of the attitude of the police to Capone's organization was that they suggested the attack came because Belcastro was an independent operator. Later in 1931, Belcastro was considered a suspect in the murder of bootlegger Matt Kolb, but was never charged.

Throughout the 1930s and 1940s, Belcastro continued to rise in the Outfit and ultimately became one of its top enforcers.  On August 23, 1945, James Belcastro died of heart disease (although other accounts mistakenly claim his date of death on October 13, 1933).

In popular culture
Belcastro was portrayed by Peter Mamakos in the 1959 television movie The Scarface Mob as well as on The Untouchables TV series.

References

Kelly, Robert J. Encyclopedia of Organized Crime in the United States. Westport, Connecticut: Greenwood Press, 2000. 
Sifakis, Carl. The Mafia Encyclopedia. New York: Da Capo Press, 2005.

Further reading
Flowers, R. Barrie, and H. Loraine Flowers. Murders in the United States: Crimes, Killers, and Victims of the Twentieth Century. Jefferson, North Carolina: McFarland & Company, 2001. 
Kobler, John. Capone: The Life and Times of Al Capone. New York: Da Capo Press, 2003. 
Johnson, Curt, and R. Craig Sautter. The Wicked City: Chicago from Kenna to Capone. New York: Da Capo Press, 1994. 
Schoenberg, Robert J. Mr. Capone. New York: HarperCollins Publishers, 1992.

External links
Homicide in Chicago 1870-1930: Interactive Database
Chicago Sun-Times: One family's rise, a century of power , details on his career in the Chicago Outfit.
Bugs Moran Online - Tony "Mops" Volpe & James Belcastro

1895 births
1933 deaths
American gangsters of Italian descent
Bombers (people)
 Chicago Outfit mobsters